Sergey Ashihmin (is a Russian-born Kyrgyzstani former swimmer, who specialized in sprint freestyle events. He is a two-time Olympian (1996 and 2000), and a former Kyrgyzstan record holder in the 50 and 100 m freestyle. While playing for the Russian senior team, Ashihmin also earned a silver medal, along with Denis Pimankov, Dmitry Chernyshov, and double Olympic champion Alexander Popov, in the 4×100 m freestyle relay at the 1999 European Aquatics Championships in Istanbul, Turkey.

Ashihmin became one of the first swimmers from Kyrgyzstan to compete at the 1996 Summer Olympics in Atlanta since the post-Soviet era. He failed to reach the top 16 final in the 100 m freestyle, finishing in twenty-ninth place with a time of 51.07. He also placed eighteenth as a member of the Kyrgyzstan team in the 4×100 m freestyle relay (3:30.62), seventeenth in the 4×200 m freestyle relay (8:00.00), and twenty-first in the 4×100 m medley relay (3:56.24).

In 1998, Ashihmin shared silver medals with Popov, Pimankov, and Roman Yegorov for Russia in the sprint freestyle relay (3:17.99), when the U.S. hosted again the Goodwill Games in New York City.

At the 2000 Summer Olympics in Sydney, Ashihmin competed again in four swimming events. He posted FINA B-standards of 23.55 (50 m freestyle) and 51.20 (100 m freestyle) from the Russian National Championships in Moscow. In the 100 m freestyle, Ashihmin placed thirty-fourth on the morning prelims. Swimming in heat six, he shared a third seed with Greece's Spyridon Bitsakis in a matching time of 51.28. Two days later, in the 50 m freestyle, Ashihmin challenged seven other swimmers in heat four, including Kazakhstan's top sprinter Sergey Borisenko. He came up short in second place and forty-first overall with a time of 23.53, trailing Borisenko by seven hundredths of a second (0.07). He also placed twentieth as a member of the Kyrgyzstan team in the 4×100 m freestyle relay (3:25.03), and nineteenth in the 4×100 m medley relay (3:46.70).

References

External links
 

1977 births
Living people
Kyrgyzstani male freestyle swimmers
Russian male freestyle swimmers
Olympic swimmers of Kyrgyzstan
Swimmers at the 1996 Summer Olympics
Swimmers at the 2000 Summer Olympics
Russian emigrants to Kyrgyzstan
Kyrgyzstani people of Russian descent
European Aquatics Championships medalists in swimming
Goodwill Games medalists in swimming
Competitors at the 1998 Goodwill Games